The Nikolaj Contemporary Art Center (formerly (from 2006 - 2010) Kunsthallen Nikolaj and (until 2006) Nikolaj Udstillingsbygning) is an arts centre in Copenhagen which occupies the former St. Nicholas Church, named after Saint Nicholas, one of the city's oldest churches and most conspicuous landmarks. It is situated on Højbro Plads, a few steps away from Amagertorv and Strøget. The tower offers some of the best views of the city centre.

History
The original church building was constructed in the early thirteenth century near Copenhagen's shore of the Øresund.  In 1530, the  Lutheran theologian  Hans Tavsen  (1494–1561) preached the first Lutheran sermon within Copenhagen in St Nicholas Church. The fire of 1795 burned down most of the building, and from 1805, it was no longer an official church. Though church ruins were demolished, the sturdy tower remains standing in the present day. Butcher stalls occupied the area around the tower until the second half of the 1800s when they were closed.

The current building, which opened in 1912, is by a design of the architect, Hans Christian Amberg (1749–1815), representing a modern reconstruction of the destroyed church. The current spire is also a modern reconstruction of the original, financed in 1909 at the initiative and expense of the brewer Carl Jacobsen (1842-1914). He also financed the 1915–1917 repairs.

The tower has served as a naval museum and its attic was at one time a library. It was also the focus of Hans Christian Andersen's drama, Love of Nicolai Tower  performed in 1829 at the Royal Theatre. When the internationally notable Danish sculptor Bertel Thorvaldsen returned to Copenhagen in 1838 after living and working for 40 years in Rome, a flag was hoisted on the tower when his ship approached to alert residents of his arrival.

Presently

Nikolaj collaborates with a range of organisations locally, nationally and internationally in the realm of new artistic forms and media.  The art center's focus is on Danish and international contemporary art. The first art exhibitions occurred at Nikolaj in 1957. Nikolaj gained prominence after the Fluxus performances of the 1960s. organized by Knud Pedersen and Arthur Köpcke.

Nikolaj is focussing on contemporary art with two annual exhibitions, one by children, and another one by an older artist who is deemed to have had a pioneering effect on modern art. Jananne Al-Ani, Leonard Cohen, Andreas Emenius, Helmut Newton, and Kutluğ Ataman have exhibited notably at Nikolaj.

References

External links

 Kunsthallen Nikolaj Official website

Arts centres in Denmark
Art museums and galleries in Copenhagen
Buildings and structures completed in 1912
1912 establishments in Denmark